The March 73S is a Group 5 prototype race car, designed, developed and built by British manufacturer March Engineering, for sports car racing, in 1973.

References

Sports prototypes